City Walk is one of the largest shopping centres in Tsuen Wan, New Territories, Hong Kong. It is located at Yeung Uk Road, beneath Vision City and opposite to Nina Tower, one of the tallest buildings in Hong Kong. It is jointly developed by Sino Land and Urban Renewal Authority. It was opened in December 2007.

The shopping mall offers shops on fashion, accessories, jewelry, lifestyle, food and beverage. It is the first "green" shopping mall in Hong Kong. It has "Citywalk Piazza" and "Vertical Garden" at the centre of the mall, with landscaped water features and a hybrid chiller system to improve air quality and recycles waste water respectively.

See also 
Vision City

References

External links

Citywalk

Buildings and structures completed in 2007
Shopping centres in Hong Kong
Tsuen Wan
Sino Group